Queer Wars: The New Gay Right and Its Critics is a 2005 book about gay conservatism by the historian Paul A. Robinson. It received both supportive and critical commentary.

Summary
Robinson examines the views of Bruce Bawer, Andrew Sullivan, Michelangelo Signorile, and Gabriel Rotello, all of whom he characterises as proponents of gay conservatism. He critically evaluates a number of books: Marshall Kirk and Hunter Madsen's After the Ball, Bawer's A Place at the Table, Sullivan's Virtually Normal and Love Undetectable, Urvashi Vaid's Virtual Equality, Michael Warner's The Trouble with Normal, Richard Goldstein's The Attack Queers, Signorile's Queer in America and Life Outside, Rotello's Sexual Ecology, and Eric Rofes's Reviving the Tribe and Dry Bones Breathe. He concludes by analysing the television series Queer as Folk.

Background and publication history
Paul A. Robinson is an American historian. Queer Wars was his twelfth book. It was first published in 2005 by the University of Chicago Press.

Reception

Popular press
Queer Wars received a positive review from J. Stauder in Choice and negative reviews from Brandon Michael Brod in the Claremont Review of Books and Jeff Ingram in Library Journal. Stauder highly recommended the book, describing it as a tour de force. Brod disputed Robinson's characterisation of Bawer, Signorile, and Rotello as conservatives. He criticised Robinson for writing from a queer activist perspective and for limiting his focus to "sex, gender, and campus politics". Ingram called Queer Wars "a book in search of a subject". He wrote that Robinson had neglected to cover the political leaders of gay conservatism and had focussed instead on "four nearly forgotten authors".

Gay press
Queer Wars received positive reviews from R. A. Horne in the Lambda Book Report, Yasmin Nair in the Windy City Times, and Jim Nawrocki in the Bay Area Reporter; and a mixed review from Duncan Mitchel in The Gay & Lesbian Review Worldwide.

Horne wrote that the book was "written in clear, spirited and effective English, informed and insightful, and [...] despite incisive criticism of its subject, [it] manages to remain honest and fair". Nair reviewed Queer Wars alongside That's Revolting! Queer Strategies for Resisting Assimilation, an anthology edited by Mattilda Bernstein Sycamore. She found Robinson's characterisation of Signorile and Rotello as conservatives "somewhat surprising", though she appreciated his arguments for including them. She described Queer Wars as "a complex analysis of the histories and legacies of 'queer'". Nawrocki credited Robinson with providing a "thorough, thoughtful, and fair examination" of the emergence of gay conservatism. He praised Queer Wars as "gracefully concise and highly readable". 

Mitchel questioned whether the writers whom Robinson characterised as gay conservatives constituted a "coherent intellectual force". He criticised Robinson's account of political divisions within gay activism as oversimplified. Nevertheless, he wrote that "Queer Wars provides a pleasant enough reading experience, and Robinson is a better writer than many of his subjects".

Scientific and academic journals
Queer Wars received positive reviews from the sociologist John H. Gagnon in Archives of Sexual Behavior and the social work scholar Gerald P. Mallon in The Journal of Sociology & Social Welfare. Gagnon reviewed Queer Wars alongside another work by Robinson, Opera, Sex and Other Vital Matters. He praised Robinson as "a distinguished historian of ideas with a long record of writing thoughtfully about sexuality and sexuality related topics". Mallon highly recommended Queer Wars, applauding Robinson's "skillful analysis of [his subjects'] work grounded in good reasoning and fairness". However, he questioned Robinson's choice to end the book with a discussion of a television show, writing that it "seemed to me to cheapen his accomplishment".

References

Bibliography
Books

Periodicals

2005 non-fiction books
2000s LGBT literature
American non-fiction books
English-language books
LGBT literature in the United States
University of Chicago Press books